V529 Andromedae, also known as HD 8801, is a variable star in the constellation of Andromeda. It has a 13th magnitude visual companion star 15" away, which is just a distant star on the same line of sight.

It is also an Am star with a spectral classification Am(kA5/hF1/mF2), meaning that it has the calcium K line of a star with spectral type A5, the Balmer series of a F1 star, and metallic lines of an F2 star.

Variability
V529 Andromedae was the first star known to combine Gamma Doradus and Delta Scuti type pulsations. Nine different pulsation frequencies have been observed, and three of them could arise from a previously unknown stellar pulsation mode.

Companion
It is a far more distant star than V529 Andromedae, only coincidentally aligned in the sky.

References

Andromeda (constellation)
A-type main-sequence stars
Andromedae, V529
008801
418
006794
Durchmusterung objects
Am stars
Delta Scuti variables
Gamma Doradus variables